Zagalav Abdulbekovich Abdulbekov (born 19 December 1945) is a retired Russian featherweight freestyle wrestler of Avar heritage. He won the world title in 1971 and 1973 and an Olympic gold medal in 1972. At the European Championships, he earned a silver in 1973 and a bronze in 1969 and 1975.

Adbulbekov took up wrestling in 1961 and later won four Soviet titles, in 1966, 1968, 1969 and 1973. After retiring from competitions he worked as a wrestling coach, and headed the Soviet freestyle team in 1974–80.

References

External links

1945 births
Living people
People from Akhvakhsky District
Soviet male sport wrestlers
Olympic wrestlers of the Soviet Union
Wrestlers at the 1972 Summer Olympics
Russian male sport wrestlers
Olympic gold medalists for the Soviet Union
Olympic medalists in wrestling
World Wrestling Championships medalists
Medalists at the 1972 Summer Olympics
European Wrestling Championships medalists
Sportspeople from Dagestan
World Wrestling Champions